Freidoune Sahebjam (1933–2008) was a French-Iranian journalist, war correspondent, and novelist who resided in Neuilly-sur-Seine in France.

He gained international recognition for his novel La Femme Lapidée, in 1990, about Soraya Manutchehri, which was translated four years later as The Stoning of Soraya M.: A True Story. The book became the basis for screenplay of the 2008 film The Stoning of Soraya M., in which the American actor James Caviezel portrays Sahebjam.

Sahebjam was a journalist for the French TV channel LCI and for French newspapers such as Le Monde and Le Telegramme.

Before his death, he had recently written a biography on his mother, an aristocrat of Qajar heritage, entitled Une Princesse Persane. He died on Wednesday 26 March 2008, at the age of 75. The cause of death was not reported.

Bibliography 
 The Stoning of Soraya M., Arcade Publishing, 1994
 Une Princesse Persane, a biography of his mother, an aristocrat of Qajar heritage
 Morte parmi les vivants : Une tragédie afghane
 La Femme Lapidée [The Stoning of Soraya M.]
 Je n'ai plus de larmes pour pleurer (with Reza Behrouzi)
 Le Vieux de la montagne
 Reviens Mahomet, ils sont devenus fous : Chroniques de la barbarie islamique ordinaire
 Le Dernier Eunuque
 Mohamad reza pahlavi, shah d'iran
 Un procès sans appel

References

External links 
 http://www.sahebjam.fr/ (in Memorial Freidoune SAHEBJAM )

20th-century French novelists
21st-century French novelists
Iranian journalists
Iranian monarchists
1933 births
2008 deaths
Iranian male novelists
Iranian novelists
Iranian emigrants to France
Iranian exiles
French male novelists
20th-century French male writers
21st-century French male writers
French male non-fiction writers
20th-century French journalists